Boti Goa Tyrolien Orphée Demel (born March 3, 1989) is an Ivorian professional footballer who last played for Zhetysu in the Kazakhstan Premier League.

Career
Born in Dabou, Goa began his career with Club Omnisport Omness Dabou and joined in summer 2007 the Portuguese top club Benfica. He played one year in Benfica's youth team, scoring 15 goals in 26 matches. In October 2008, he went on trial to Girona FC, but subsequently signed with Armenian side Mika F.C. On 28 February, he was sold to Rosenborg BK.

In January 2012, the Norwegian media reported that Goa was arriving late from vacation for the second time in four months, and wondered if his time in Rosenborg had come to an end. It was later revealed that Goa was at the hospital after being involved in a car accident in Ivory Coast.

In June 2016, Goa left FC Zhetysu.

International career
Goa is former member of the Ivory Coast national under-20 football team.

Career statistics

Club

Notes

References

External links

1989 births
Living people
People from Dabou
Ivorian footballers
Ivorian expatriate footballers
Association football forwards
Eliteserien players
Armenian Premier League players
Kazakhstan Premier League players
S.L. Benfica footballers
FC Mika players
Rosenborg BK players
FC Zhetysu players
Expatriate footballers in Armenia
Expatriate footballers in Norway
Expatriate footballers in Portugal
Expatriate footballers in Kazakhstan
Ivorian expatriate sportspeople in Portugal
Expatriate footballers in Spain
Ivorian expatriate sportspeople in Spain